Mictocommosis is a genus of moths belonging to the family Tortricidae.

Species
Mictocommosis argus  Walsingham, 1897
Mictocommosis godmani (Walsingham, 1914)
Mictocommosis microctenota  Meyrick, 1933
Mictocommosis nigromaculata  Issiki, 1930
Mictocommosis stemmatias  Meyrick, 1921

References
tortricidae.com

 
Hilarographini
Tortricidae genera
Taxa named by Alexey Diakonoff